Elena Cuza National College may refer to one of two educational institutions in Romania:

Elena Cuza National College (Bucharest)
Elena Cuza National College (Craiova)